This is a list of current and defunct automobile manufacturers of Russia.

Major current manufacturers

 AvtoVAZ (1966–present) 
 Lada
 GAZ (1932–present)
 AZLK (1930–present)
 KAMAZ (1969–present)
 NAMI (1918–present) 
 Aurus Motors
 UAZ (1941–present)

Other current manufacturers

 Aleko (1985)
 Avtokam (1989)
 Avtotor (1996)
 Dragon (1997)
 Ford Sollers (2011)
 GM-AvtoVAZ (2001)
 Kombat Armouring (1985)
 Renault Russia (1998)
 SeAZ (1939)
 Silant (2010)
 Sollers JSC (2002)
 SpetsTekh (2006)
 VAZInterService (1991)
 Yarovit Motors (2003)

Former manufacturers

 Amur (1967-2012)
 Doninvest (1997)
 IzhAvto (1965-2008)
 Marussia (2007-2014)
 Russo-Balt (1894-1923/2006)
 TagAZ (1997-2014)
 Yo-Mobile (2010-2014)
 ZiL (1916–2013)
 ZMA (1985-2010)
 Derways Automobile Company (2003-2019)

Local automakers

See also
List of automobile manufacturers
List of automobile marques
List of motorcycle manufacturers
List of truck manufacturers

 
Lists of automobile manufacturers
Automobile manufacturers
Automobile manufacturers